Raimi Kola Kowiyu is a Nigeria-born naturalized Beninese national soccer team player. He presently plays for AS Tonnerre in the benin premier league 2019–20 season. He has played as forward for Abia Warriors. in the Nigeria Premier League, Buffles du Borgou FC, ASPAC FC.

Kowiyou Kola scored 2 goals in 6 games for the Beninese U17 team, and 2 goals in 7 games with the U20s. As a national team player, he has scored 2 goals in 7 games. He has been playing for the benin republic senior national team since 3 years as he is part of the current senior national team players.

Kola Raimi got call-up back into the benin senior national team after his contract expiration with Abia Warriors.

References

Beninese footballers
Living people
1995 births
Association football forwards
Benin international footballers
Buffles du Borgou FC players
ASPAC FC players
Abia Warriors F.C. players